Dale Martin Hawerchuk (April 4, 1963 – August 18, 2020) was a Canadian professional ice hockey player and coach. Drafted first overall by the Winnipeg Jets in the 1981 NHL Entry Draft, Hawerchuk played in the National Hockey League (NHL) for 16 seasons as a member of the Jets, Buffalo Sabres, St. Louis Blues and Philadelphia Flyers. He won the NHL's Calder Memorial Trophy as the league's Rookie of the Year in 1982 and was elected to the Hockey Hall of Fame in his second year of eligibility in 2001. Hawerchuk served as the head coach of the Barrie Colts of the Ontario Hockey League from 2010 to 2019.

Playing career
Hawerchuk was a young prodigy who received his first pair of skates at age two and, according to his father, "was skating before he could walk." Beginning competitive hockey at age four, Hawerchuk demonstrated superior skills almost immediately. At the Quebec International Pee-Wee Hockey Tournament, he scored all eight goals during an 8–1 victory in the finals, smashing the long-standing record set by the legendary Guy Lafleur. By age 15, the famed Oshawa Generals offered him a tryout, though he did not make the team. In 1979, Hawerchuk was selected 6th overall by the Cornwall Royals of the Quebec Major Junior Hockey League, and became somewhat of a rarity; a Toronto-born player starring in the QMJHL. He recorded 103 points and was named Rookie of the Year.  Hawerchuk was the playoff MVP and led the Royals to the Memorial Cup championship. In his second junior year, he scored 81 goals and 183 points and led the Royals to their second consecutive Memorial Cup title. He was named a QMJHL First Team All-Star, the Canadian Major Junior Player of the Year, and Memorial Cup MVP.

The Winnipeg Jets selected Hawerchuk first overall in the 1981 NHL Entry Draft, ahead of fellow future Hall of Famers Ron Francis, Grant Fuhr, and Chris Chelios. Hawerchuk immediately became Winnipeg's star attraction, leading the Jets to what was at the time the largest single season turn-around in NHL history, a 48-point improvement. He became the youngest NHL player in history to reach 100 points (a record since broken by Sidney Crosby in 2006), finishing with 103, and winning the Calder Memorial Trophy as the NHL's Rookie of the Year. He also played in that season's All-Star Game. Hawerchuk recorded 91 points in his second season, then hit the 100-plus point plateau for the next five consecutive years, including a career-high 53 goals and 130 points in 1984–85.

During the 1990 NHL Entry Draft, Hawerchuk was involved in a blockbuster trade. Along with Winnipeg's 1st round choice (14th overall pick, Brad May) in the draft, he was dealt to the Buffalo Sabres in exchange for Phil Housley, Scott Arniel, Jeff Parker and Buffalo's 1st round choice (19th overall pick, Keith Tkachuk). Over the next four years he recorded no fewer than 86 points. His point totals fell off during an injury plagued and lockout shortened 1994–95 season. In 1995, he signed with the St. Louis Blues, recording 41 points in 66 games before a trade to the Philadelphia Flyers in March, 1996. He finished the season strongly, scoring 20 points in the season's final 16 games and adding 9 points in the playoffs. The next season, he was plagued by injuries but managed 34 points and played in his fifth All-Star Game. Hawerchuk announced his retirement from the game following the 1996–97 season at age 34 due to a degenerative left hip. His appearance with the Flyers in the 1997 Stanley Cup Finals marked the only time any of his teams advanced past the second round of the playoffs.

He played for Team Canada in the 1987 Canada Cup tournament, and had a goal and two assists in the decisive third game of the Finals against the Soviets. Late in the third period, he won the face-off that led to Canada's most famous goal and tied up with the Russian player who tried to check Mario Lemieux at centre ice, allowing Lemieux to take Wayne Gretzky's pass in the slot for the series winner. Hawerchuk was named Canada's MVP for that decisive game. Commentators remarked on his ability in the series to switch from being a goal scorer to a mucker and grinder. Hawerchuk was also key to Canada's 1991 Canada Cup victory.

In a poll of NHL general managers during the mid-1980s asking them to select the player they would start a franchise with, Hawerchuk was voted third behind only Gretzky and Paul Coffey. He retired with 518 goals, 891 assists and 1,409 points, placing him 18th on the career NHL points list. He was inducted into the Hockey Hall of Fame in 2001.

The Phoenix Coyotes (successor to the Jets) retired Hawerchuk's No. 10 during the 2006–07 NHL season.

Post-playing career
Hawerchuk became the president, director of hockey operations, and primary owner of the Ontario Provincial Junior A Hockey League's Orangeville Crushers in 2007. He left this position in 2010.

On June 4, 2010, the Barrie Colts of the Ontario Hockey League named Hawerchuk as their head coach and director of hockey operations.  The 2010–11 season was a rebuilding one for the Colts, as the team went 15–49–2–2, missing the playoffs for the first time in team history. In his sophomore year, the 2011–12 season, Hawerchuk amassed a record of 40–23–3–2; a significant improvement over his rookie season as bench boss of the Colts.

Personal life
Hawerchuk was born in Toronto, Ontario, but grew up in Oshawa, Ontario.  He was married to Crystal, whom he met in Manitoba while playing for the Jets.  The couple had three children.  

Hawerchuck's son Ben Hawerchuk plays professional hockey as a forward for the Jacksonville Icemen of the ECHL.  Ben had previously played for the Barrie Colts.

Illness and death
In 2019, Hawerchuk announced he would be taking a leave of absence from the Colts for health reasons, which was later revealed to be stomach cancer. Hawerchuk completed a course of chemotherapy in April 2020, but died on August 18, 2020 at the age of 57. He was buried in Thornton Cemetery in Oshawa.

Awards and achievements 
RDS Cup (QMJHL Rookie of the Year) (1980)
Guy Lafleur Trophy (QMJHL Playoff MVP) (1980)
QMJHL Championships (1980 and 1981)
Memorial Cup championships (1980 and 1981)
Memorial Cup All-Star First Team (1980 and 1981)
Jean Béliveau Trophy (QMJHL Scoring Champion) (1981)
QMJHL First Team All-Star (1981)
Michel Brière Memorial Trophy (QMJHL Player of the Year) (1981)
Stafford Smythe Memorial Trophy (Memorial Cup MVP) (1981)
CHL Player of the Year (1981)
Played in NHL All-Star Game 5 times - 1982,1985,1986,1988,1997
Calder Memorial Trophy winner (1982)
World Championships bronze medal (1982 and 1986)
World Championships silver medal (1989)
NHL Second Team All-Star Centre (1985)
Canada Cup Championships (1987 and 1991)
First NHL player to reach 1000 career NHL games before age 31
Inducted into the Hockey Hall of Fame in 2001
Honoured Member of the Manitoba Hockey Hall of Fame
 Member of the Manitoba Sports Hall of Fame (2013)
Inducted into the Buffalo Sabres Hall of Fame in 2011
Inducted into the Phoenix Coyotes Ring of Honor in 2007, joining Bobby Hull and Thomas Steen. The Jets/Coyotes franchise retired his number 10 on April 5, 2007. Unlike Hull and Steen, who were honored in Jets colors, Hawerchuk's number was retired in Coyotes apparel, despite the fact that Hawerchuk never played in Phoenix.
Honored by the second Winnipeg Jets franchise: named captain of the Jets' alumni squad at the 2016 Heritage Classic, inducted into the team's Hall of Fame in 2017, and by a statue near the Canada Life Centre, the Jets' current arena located in downtown Winnipeg.  Out of respect for Hawerchuk, number 10 has not been worn by any Jets player since that team relocated to Winnipeg in 2011.
Holds the record for most assists in a period, with five in the second period of Winnipeg's 7-3 win at Los Angeles on March 6, 1984 .

Career statistics

Regular season and playoffs

International

Coaching record

See also
Captain (hockey)
List of NHL players with 1000 points
List of NHL players with 500 goals
List of NHL statistical leaders

References

External links
Official website

Dale Hawerchuk's biography at Manitoba Hockey Hall of Fame
Profile at hockeydraftcentral.com

1963 births
2020 deaths
Buffalo Sabres players
Calder Trophy winners
Canadian ice hockey centres
Canadian people of Ukrainian descent
Cornwall Royals (QMJHL) players
Deaths from cancer in Ontario
Deaths from stomach cancer
Hockey Hall of Fame inductees
Ice hockey people from Toronto
National Hockey League All-Stars
National Hockey League first-overall draft picks
National Hockey League first-round draft picks
National Hockey League players with retired numbers
Philadelphia Flyers players
St. Louis Blues players
Sportspeople from Oshawa
Winnipeg Jets (1972–1996) captains
Winnipeg Jets (1979–1996) draft picks
Winnipeg Jets (1979–1996) players